Sonny Shepherd is a Cook Island former professional rugby league footballer who played in the 1990s and 2000s. He played at representative level for the Cook Islands, and at club level for Ngatangiia/Matavera Sea Eagles.

Playing career
Shepherd played for the Ngatangiia/Matavera Sea Eagles in the Cook Islands domestic competition.

Shepherd played for the Cook Islands in the 1995 Emerging Nations Tournament and at the 2000 Rugby League World Cup.

References

External links

Cook Islands national rugby league team players
Cook Island rugby league players
Living people
Place of birth missing (living people)
Year of birth missing (living people)